This page shows the results of the triathlon competition at the 2003 Pan American Games, held on August 10, 2003 in Santo Domingo, Dominican Republic. For the third time the sport was a part of the multi-sports event of the America's.

Qualifying
 3 spots to be awarded at the ITU Regional Championship in Rio de Janeiro, September 15, 2002 
 3 spots to be awarded at the Central American and Caribbean Games, El Salvador, November 28, 2002 
 3 spots to be awarded at the ITU points race in La Paz, Argentina, 2003 
 20 spots to be awarded through the Patco rankings (which is extracted from the ITU rankings, with events in the Americas only). If countries have filled the maximum 3 spots by previous event criteria, the spots roll down in the rankings
 5 spots to be awarded as wild cards 
 1 spot for the host country Dominican Republic

Men's competition

Women's competition

See also
Triathlon at the 2002 Central American and Caribbean Games
Triathlon at the 2002 South American Games

References
Qualifying Criteria
Results
Results

P
2003
Events at the 2003 Pan American Games